Jaye P. Morgan (born Mary Margaret Morgan) is a retired American popular music singer, actress, and game show panelist.

Early life
Morgan was born in Mancos in Montezuma County in far southwestern Colorado.  Her family moved to California by the time she was in high school. Morgan had six siblings; five brothers and one sister. In the late 1940s, at Verdugo Hills High School in the Tujunga neighborhood of Los Angeles, she served as class treasurer (and got the nickname "Jaye P." after the banker J. P. Morgan) and sang at school assemblies, accompanied by her brother on guitar.

Career

In 1950, a year after her graduation from high school, Morgan made a recording of "Life Is Just a Bowl of Cherries" issued by Derby Records, which made it to #26 on the U.S. Billboard record chart. Soon after, she received an RCA Victor recording contract, and she had five hits in one year, including her biggest hit "That's All I Want from You",  which reached #3 on the chart. Other notable hits included "There's a Dream in My Heart" by Rolande Maxwell Young, "The Longest Walk" and "Pepper Hot Baby". In 1954, she married Michael Baiano. She joined MGM Records in 1959 after spending the previous six years with RCA Victor.

From 1954 to 1955, Morgan was a vocalist on the ABC television series show Stop the Music. In November 1955, the British music magazine, NME, reported that Morgan was the top female vocalist in the U.S. Cash Box poll. Beginning January 11, 1954, she was a featured singer on the Robert Q. Lewis Show on CBS-TV.

In 1956, she had her own show, The Jaye P. Morgan Show, and made guest appearances on a number of other variety shows. She was a charter member of the Robert Q. Lewis "gang" on Lewis's weekday program on CBS, and was featured on a special episode of The Jackie Gleason Show in which Lewis's entire company substituted for the vacationing Gleason. In 1958, Morgan appeared on ABC's The Pat Boone Chevy Showroom. On October 6, 1960, she guest starred on NBC's The Ford Show, Starring Tennessee Ernie Ford.

In 1961, Morgan was cast as Sally Dwight in the episode "Money and the Minister" of the CBS anthology series, General Electric Theater, hosted by Ronald Reagan. In 1962, she played Patty Maxwell in "Patti's Tune" of the CBS military sitcom/drama Hennesey, starring Jackie Cooper. That same year, she was cast as Kitty Flanders in "That's Showbiz" on NBC's The Joey Bishop Show. In 1964, Morgan was cast as Ruth Evans in the episode "Sunday Father" of the NBC medical drama The Eleventh Hour. 
 
She spent considerable time in the 1960s making nightclub appearances. In 1966, she guest starred on CBS's My Three Sons as fading singer Claudia Farrell in the episode "A Falling Star".

In 1973, Morgan played herself in the episode "The Songwriter" of the sitcom, The Odd Couple. She appeared as Magda Valentine in the 1973 film The All-American Boy, 

Morgan guest starred on The Muppet Show in 1978, where she sang "That Old Black Magic" as a duet with Dr. Teeth.

Morgan had smaller roles in films including Loose Shoes (1980), Night Patrol (1984), and Home Alone 2: Lost in New York (1992).

Game show panelist
From 1976 to 1978, Morgan was a regular panelist on The Gong Show, on which she achieved notoriety for flashing her breasts. She also appeared on Rhyme and Reason and Match Game and in the 1980 "behind-the-scenes" movie version of The Gong Show. She also appeared on the Playboy Channel game show Everything Goes, and with her former Gong partner Jamie Farr on Hollywood Squares Game Show Week II in 2004.

Morgan appeared as herself in Confessions of a Dangerous Mind, a 2003 semi-biographical film about the life of Chuck Barris, creator of The Gong Show as well as television game shows The Dating Game, and The Newlywed Game.

Discography

Albums

Singles

References

External links

Living people
American women pop singers
Traditional pop music singers
RCA Victor artists
MGM Records artists
American film actresses
American television actresses
People from Montezuma County, Colorado
Singers from Los Angeles
Actresses from Los Angeles
21st-century American women
1931 births